Luisa Recabárren de Marin (1777 – after 1820), was one of the national heroines of the Chilean War of Independence. A socialite and the host of a literary salon, she was able to serve as a spy and advisor for the rebels using her influential contacts.

Biography

Early and personal life 
Luisa's high-status parents gave her a high-quality education, where she learned French. In addition to this, she possessed a great curiosity for a variety of topics, including historical, social, religious, and political matters.

Her children were: , Mercedes, Estanislao, and Javiera.

Salon 
Influenced by the work of the pro-Chilean independence Camilo Henríquez, Luisa Recabárren de Marin used her salon as a platform to discuss revolutionary ideas. In her salon, she planned revolts using information from high-profile contacts and plotted a path towards independence. Her advice was well-respected and heeded, and her salon was regarded as the epicenter of discussion of the revolution.

Later, as Spanish forces advanced in Chile, all of her personal assets (her husband had temporarily relocated to Argentina and she managed his business) were seized by the Spanish. However, she was able to get them back and resume her salon due to her high status.

She was imprisoned in the Las de Agustinas Monastery from 4 January to 12 February 1817.

Death 

Sources are not specific about her death, but one reports that she died in Santiago on 31 May 1839.

References

 R. Adams, Jerome:  Notable Latin American Women: Twenty-nine Leaders, Rebels, Poets, Battlers and spies, 1500-1900 MacFarland (1995)

1777 births
Women in 19th-century warfare
Female wartime spies
19th-century spies
Chilean salon-holders
Year of death missing
19th-century Chilean people